Adal Singh Kansana is an Indian politician. He was elected to the Madhya Pradesh Legislative Assembly from Sumawali. He was an elected member of the Madhya Pradesh Legislative Assembly in 1993 and 1998 as a member of the Bahujan Samaj Party and in 2008 and 2018 as a member of the Indian National Congress. During 2020 Madhya Pradesh political crisis, he supported senior Congress leader Jyotiraditya Scindia and was one of the 22 MLAs who resigned and later joined Bharatiya Janata Party.

References

Madhya Pradesh MLAs 1993–1998
Madhya Pradesh MLAs 1998–2003
Madhya Pradesh MLAs 2008–2013
Madhya Pradesh MLAs 2018–2023
Bharatiya Janata Party politicians from Madhya Pradesh
Living people
People from Chhatarpur district
Indian National Congress politicians from Madhya Pradesh
Bahujan Samaj Party politicians from Madhya Pradesh
Year of birth missing (living people)